Kolokolovskaya is a rural locality (a village) in Lipovskoye Rural Settlement of Velsky District, Arkhangelsk Oblast, Russia. The population was 33 as of 2014. There are 3 streets.

Geography 
Kolokolovskaya is located on the Verkhopuyskoye Lake, 123 km northwest of Velsk (the district's administrative centre) by road. Sidorovskaya is the nearest rural locality.

References 

Rural localities in Velsky District
Velsky Uyezd